, Cathay Pacific serves 78 destinations including charter and cargo services, in 29 countries across Asia, Europe, North America and Oceania.

See also
 List of Cathay Dragon destinations
 HK Express destinations

References

Cathay Pacific Network

Lists of airline destinations
Oneworld destinations
Destinations
Hong Kong transport-related lists